Gâteau de Sirop is a syrup cake in Cajun cuisine. It is made with cane syrup.

See also
Basbousa

References

Cajun cuisine
American cakes